is a Japanese voice actress from Kanagawa Prefecture, Japan.

Filmography

Anime
Unknown date
 Ayakashi Ninden Kunoichiban – Kaede Hagakure
 Beyblade – Hiromi Tachibana
 Galerians: Ash – Lilia Pascalle
 Martian Successor Nadesico – Hikaru Amano
 Martian Successor Nadesico: The Prince of Darkness – Hikaru Amano
 Mazinkaiser vs. Great General of Darkness – Roll
 Meltylancer – Patricia MacGarren
 Papillion Rose – Tsubomi
 Princess Rouge – Rogue
 Stratos 4 – Ayamo Nakamura
 Vandread – Amarone Slantheav

Video games
 Tokimeki Memorial – Miharu Tatebayashi
 Tekken 2 – Jun Kazama, Kunimitsu
 Harmul Park – Lesca
 Dodge De Bell! – Kyoko Ageha
 Tekken Tag Tournament – Jun Kazama, Kunimitsu
 The King of Fighters '99 – Whip
 The King of Fighters 2000 – Whip
 Eithea – Hikaru Ito
 The King of Fighters 2001 – Whip
 The King of Fighters 2002 – Whip
 Atelier Violet: The Alchemist of Gramnad 2 – Brigitt Sihern
 Puyo Pop Fever – Amitie
 The King of Fighters 2003 – Whip
 Puyo Puyo Fever 2 – Amitie
 The King of Fighters XI – Whip
 Super Robot Wars A Portable – Hikaru Amano
 Puyo Puyo Chronicles – Amitie
 Puyo Puyo! 15th Anniversary – Amitie
 Puyo Puyo 7 – Amitie
 Puyo Puyo Tetris – Amitie
 Puyo Puyo!! 20th Anniversary – Amitie
 Super Robot Wars V – Hikaru Amano
 The King of Fighters XIV – Whip
 Another Eden: The Cat Beyond Time and Space – Lovinia, Erina
 The King of Fighters All Star – Whip
 Super Robot Wars T – Hikaru Amano
 Puyo Puyo Tetris 2 – Amitie
 The King of Fighters XV – Whip

References

External links
 
 Shiho Kikuchi at GamePlaza -Haruka- Voice Acting DataBase 

1972 births
Living people
Japanese video game actresses
Japanese voice actresses
Voice actresses from Kanagawa Prefecture
20th-century Japanese actresses
21st-century Japanese actresses